Isobutylidenediurea (abbreviated IBDU) is an organic compound with the formula (CH3)2CHCH{NHC(O)NH2}2.  It is a derivative of urea (OC(NH2)2), which itself is highly soluble in water, but IBDU is not.  It functions as a controlled-release fertiliser owing to its low solubility, which limits the rate of its hydrolysis to urea, which is a fast-acting fertiliser.  

It is produced by the condensation reaction of isobutyraldehyde and two equivalents of urea:
 (CH3)2CHCHO  +  2 OC(NH2)2   →    (CH3)2CHCH{NHC(O)NH2}2  +  H2O
The controlled-release process is the reverse of the above reaction, which only occurs after the IBDU dissolves.

Related materials
A number of CRF's have been developed based on urea.  Related to IBDU is crotonylidene diurea (Crotodur). Simpler are various urea-formaldehyde materials such as ureaform, which consists of methylene diurea and dimethylene triurea.

References

Ureas
Soil improvers
Fertilizers